William Ray Newsome (born March 2, 1948) is a former American football defensive end in the National Football League (NFL) for the Baltimore Colts, New Orleans Saints, New York Jets, and the Chicago Bears. He played college football at Grambling State University.

He was traded along with a 1973 fourth-round pick (86th overall–Jim Merlo) from the Colts to the Saints for a 1973 first-round selection (2nd overall–Bert Jones) on January 29, 1973.

References

1948 births
Living people
People from Jacksonville, Texas
Players of American football from Texas
American football defensive linemen
Grambling State Tigers football players
Baltimore Colts players
New Orleans Saints players
New York Jets players
Chicago Bears players